High-temperature superconductors (abbreviated high-c or HTS) are defined as materials that behave as superconductors at temperatures above , the boiling point of liquid nitrogen.  The adjective "high temperature" is only in respect to previously known superconductors, which function at even colder temperatures close to absolute zero.  In absolute terms, these "high temperatures" are still far below ambient, and therefore require cooling.  The first high-temperature superconductor was discovered in 1986, by IBM researchers Bednorz and Müller, who were awarded the Nobel Prize in Physics in 1987 "for their important break-through in the discovery of superconductivity in ceramic materials". Most high-c materials are type-II superconductors.

The major advantage of high-temperature superconductors is that they can be cooled by using liquid nitrogen, as opposed to the previously known superconductors which require expensive and hard-to-handle coolants, primarily liquid helium. A second advantage of high-c materials is they retain their superconductivity in higher magnetic fields than previous materials.  This is important when constructing superconducting magnets, a primary application of high-c materials.

The majority of high-temperature superconductors are ceramic materials, as opposed to the previously known metallic materials.  Ceramic superconductors are suitable for some practical uses but they still have many manufacturing issues. For example,  most ceramics are brittle which makes the fabrication of wires from them very problematic.  However, overcoming these drawbacks is the subject  of considerable research, and progress is ongoing.

The main class of high-temperature superconductors is copper oxides combined with other metals, especially the Rare-earth barium copper oxides (REBCOs) such as Yttrium barium copper oxide (YBCO). The second class of high-temperature superconductors in the practical classification is the iron-based compounds.
Magnesium diboride is sometimes included in high-temperature superconductors: It is relatively simple to manufacture, but it superconducts only below 43 K, which makes it unsuitable for liquid nitrogen cooling (approximately 30 K below nitrogen triple point temperature).  Some extremely-high pressure superhydride compounds are usually categorized as high-temperature superconductors. In fact, many articles on high-temperature superconductors can be found on this research on high pressure gases, which are not suitable for practical applications. The current c record holder is carbonaceous sulfur hydride, beating the previous record held by lanthanum decahydride by nearly 30 K. The superconductivity in these compounds, however, has recently come under question.

History

Superconductivity was discovered by Kamerlingh Onnes in 1911, in a metal solid. Ever since, researchers have attempted to observe superconductivity at increasing temperatures with the goal of finding a room-temperature superconductor. 
By the late 1970s, superconductivity was observed in several metallic compounds (in particular Nb-based, such as NbTi, Nb3Sn, and Nb3Ge) at temperatures that were much higher than those for elemental metals and which could even exceed . 
In 1986, at the IBM research lab near Zurich, in Switzerland, Bednorz and Müller were looking for superconductivity in a new class of ceramics: the copper oxides, or cuprates. 
Their results were soon confirmed by many groups, notably Paul Chu at the University of Houston and Shoji Tanaka at the University of Tokyo.

In 1987, Anderson gave the first theoretical description of these materials, based on the resonating valence bond theory, but a full understanding of these materials is still developing today. These superconductors are now known to possess a d-wave pair symmetry. The first proposal that high-temperature cuprate superconductivity involves d-wave pairing was made in 1987 by Bickers, Scalapino and Scalettar, followed by three subsequent theories in 1988 by Inui, Doniach, Hirschfeld and Ruckenstein, using spin-fluctuation theory, and by Gros, Poilblanc, Rice and Zhang, and by Kotliar and Liu identifying d-wave pairing as a natural consequence of the RVB theory. The confirmation of the d-wave nature of the cuprate superconductors was made by a variety of experiments, including the direct observation of the d-wave nodes in the excitation spectrum through Angle Resolved Photoemission Spectroscopy, the observation of a half-integer flux in tunneling experiments, and indirectly from the temperature dependence of the penetration depth, specific heat and thermal conductivity.

As of 2021, the superconductor with the highest transition temperature at ambient pressure is the cuprate of mercury, barium, and calcium, at around 133 K. There are other superconductors with higher recorded transition temperaturesfor example lanthanum superhydride at 250 K, but these only occur at very high pressures.

The origin of high-temperature superconductivity is still not clear, but it seems that instead of electron-phonon attraction mechanisms, as in conventional superconductivity, one is dealing with genuine electronic mechanisms (e.g. by antiferromagnetic correlations), and instead of conventional, purely s-wave pairing, more exotic pairing symmetries are thought to be involved (d-wave in the case of the cuprates; primarily extended s-wave, but occasionally d-wave, in the case of the iron-based superconductors). 
In 2014, evidence showing that fractional particles can happen in quasi two-dimensional magnetic materials, was found by EPFL scientists lending support for Anderson's theory of high-temperature superconductivity.

Selected list of superconductors

Properties
Unfortunately, the "High-temperature" superconductor class has had many definitions in the context of superconductivity.

The label high-c should be reserved for materials with critical temperatures greater than the boiling point of liquid nitrogen. However, a number of materialsincluding the original discovery and recently discovered pnictide superconductorshave critical temperatures below 77 K but nonetheless, are commonly referred to in publications as high-c class.

A substance with a critical temperature above the boiling point of liquid nitrogen, together with a high critical magnetic field and critical current density (above which superconductivity is destroyed), would greatly benefit technological applications. In magnet applications, the high critical magnetic field may prove more valuable than the high c itself. Some cuprates have an upper critical field of about 100 tesla. However, cuprate materials are brittle ceramics which are expensive to manufacture and not easily turned into wires or other useful shapes. Furthermore, high-temperature superconductors do not form large, continuous superconducting domains, rather clusters of microdomains within which superconductivity occurs. They are therefore unsuitable for applications requiring actual superconductive currents, such as magnets for magnetic resonance spectrometers. For a solution to this (powders), see HTS_wire.

There has been considerable debate regarding high-temperature superconductivity coexisting with magnetic ordering in YBCO, iron-based superconductors, several ruthenocuprates and other exotic superconductors, and the search continues for other families of materials. HTS are Type-II superconductors, which allow magnetic fields to penetrate their interior in quantized units of flux, meaning that much higher magnetic fields are required to suppress superconductivity. The layered structure also gives a directional dependence to the magnetic field response.

All known high-c superconductors are Type-II superconductors. In contrast to Type-I superconductors, which expel all magnetic fields due to the Meissner effect, Type-II superconductors allow magnetic fields to penetrate their interior in quantized units of flux, creating "holes" or "tubes" of normal metallic regions in the superconducting bulk called vortices. Consequently, high-c superconductors can sustain much higher magnetic fields.

Cuprates

Cuprates are layered materials, consisting of superconducting layers of copper oxide, separated by spacer layers.
Cuprates generally have a structure close to that of a two-dimensional material. Their superconducting properties are determined by electrons moving within weakly coupled copper-oxide (CuO2) layers. Neighbouring layers contain ions such as lanthanum, barium, strontium, or other atoms which act to stabilize the structure and dope electrons or holes onto the copper-oxide layers. The undoped "parent" or "mother" compounds are Mott insulators with long-range antiferromagnetic order at sufficiently low temperatures. Single band models are generally considered to be enough to describe the electronic properties.

The cuprate superconductors adopt a perovskite structure. The copper-oxide planes are checkerboard lattices with squares of O2− ions with a Cu2+ ion at the centre of each square. The unit cell is rotated by 45° from these squares. Chemical formulae of superconducting materials generally contain fractional numbers to describe the doping required for superconductivity. There are several families of cuprate superconductors and they can be categorized by the elements they contain and the number of adjacent copper-oxide layers in each superconducting block. For example, YBCO and BSCCO can alternatively be referred to as "Y123" and Bi2201/Bi2212/Bi2223 depending on the number of layers in each superconducting block. The superconducting transition temperature has been found to peak at an optimal doping value (=0.16) and an optimal number of layers in each superconducting block, typically =3.

Possible mechanisms for superconductivity in the cuprates continue to be the subject of considerable debate and further research. Certain aspects common to all materials have been identified. Similarities between the antiferromagnetic the low-temperature state of undoped materials and the superconducting state that emerges upon doping, primarily the x2-y2 orbital state of the Cu2+ ions, suggest that electron-electron interactions are more significant than electron-phonon interactions in cupratesmaking the superconductivity unconventional. Recent work on the Fermi surface has shown that nesting occurs at four points in the antiferromagnetic Brillouin zone where spin waves exist and that the superconducting energy gap is larger at these points. The weak isotope effects observed for most cuprates contrast with conventional superconductors that are well described by BCS theory.

Similarities and differences in the properties of hole-doped and electron doped cuprates:
 Presence of a pseudogap phase up to at least optimal doping.
 Different trends in the Uemura plot relating transition temperature to the superfluid density. The inverse square of the London penetration depth appears to be proportional to the critical temperature for a large number of underdoped cuprate superconductors, but the constant of proportionality is different for hole- and electron-doped cuprates. The linear trend implies that the physics of these materials is strongly two-dimensional.
 Universal hourglass-shaped feature in the spin excitations of cuprates measured using inelastic neutron diffraction.
 Nernst effect evident in both the superconducting and pseudogap phases.

The electronic structure of superconducting cuprates is highly anisotropic (see the crystal structure of YBCO or BSCCO). Therefore, the Fermi surface of HTSC is very close to the Fermi surface of the doped CuO2 plane (or multi-planes, in case of multi-layer cuprates) and can be presented on the 2‑D reciprocal space (or momentum space) of the CuO2 lattice. The typical Fermi surface within the first CuO2 Brillouin zone is sketched in Fig. 1 (left). It can be derived from the band structure calculations or measured by angle resolved photoemission spectroscopy (ARPES). Fig. 1 (right) shows the Fermi surface of BSCCO measured by ARPES. In a wide range of charge carrier concentration (doping level), in which the hole-doped HTSC are superconducting, the Fermi surface is hole-like (i.e. open, as shown in Fig. 1). This results in an inherent in-plane anisotropy of the electronic properties of HTSC. In 2018, the full three dimensional Fermi surface structure was derived from soft x-ray ARPES.

Iron-based 

Iron-based superconductors contain layers of iron and a pnictogensuch as arsenic or phosphorusor a chalcogen. This is currently the family with the second highest critical temperature, behind the cuprates. Interest in their superconducting properties began in 2006 with the discovery of superconductivity in LaFePO at 4 K and gained much greater attention in 2008 after the analogous material LaFeAs(O,F) was found to superconduct at up to 43 K under pressure.
The highest critical temperatures in the iron-based superconductor family exist in thin films of FeSe, where a critical temperature in excess of 100 K was reported in 2014.

Since the original discoveries several families of iron-based superconductors have emerged:
 LnFeAs(O,F) or LnFeAsO1−x (Ln=lanthanide) with c up to 56 K, referred to as 1111 materials. A fluoride variant of these materials was subsequently found with similar c values.
(Ba,K)Fe2As2 and related materials with pairs of iron-arsenide layers, referred to as 122 compounds. c values range up to 38 K. These materials also superconduct when iron is replaced with cobalt.
 LiFeAs and NaFeAs with c up to around 20 K. These materials superconduct close to stoichiometric composition and are referred to as 111 compounds.
 FeSe with small off-stoichiometry or tellurium doping.

Most undoped iron-based superconductors show a tetragonal-orthorhombic structural phase transition followed at lower temperature by magnetic ordering, similar to the cuprate superconductors. However, they are poor metals rather than Mott insulators and have five bands at the Fermi surface rather than one. 
The phase diagram emerging as the iron-arsenide layers are doped is remarkably similar, with the superconducting phase close to or overlapping the magnetic phase. Strong evidence that the c value varies with the As-Fe-As bond angles has already emerged and shows that the optimal c value is obtained with undistorted FeAs4 tetrahedra. The symmetry of the pairing wavefunction is still widely debated, but an extended s-wave scenario is currently favoured.

Magnesium diboride
Magnesium diboride is occasionally referred to as a high-temperature superconductor because its c value of 39 K is above that historically expected for BCS superconductors. However, it is more generally regarded as the highest c conventional superconductor, the increased c resulting from two separate bands being present at the Fermi level.

Carbon-based
In 1991 Hebard et al discovered Fulleride superconductors, where alkali-metal atoms are intercalated into C60 molecules.

In 2008 Ganin et al demonstrated superconductivity at temperatures of up to 38 K for Cs3C60.

P-doped Graphane was proposed in 2010 to be capable of sustaining high-temperature superconductivity.

Nickelates
In 1999, Anisimov et al. conjectured superconductivity in nickelates, proposing nickel oxides as direct analogs to the cuprate superconductors. The superconducting phase is only observed in the oxygen reduced film and is not seen in oxygen reduced bulk material of the same stoichiometry, suggesting that the strain induced by the oxygen reduction of the Nd0.8Sr0.2NiO2 thin film changes the phase space to allow for superconductivity.
Of important is further to extract access hydrogen from the reduction with CaH2, otherwise topotactic hydrogen may prevent superconductivity.

Cuprates 

The structure of cuprates which are superconductors are often closely related to perovskite structure, and the structure of these compounds has been described as a distorted, oxygen deficient multi-layered perovskite structure. One of the properties of the crystal structure of oxide superconductors is an alternating multi-layer of CuO2 planes with superconductivity taking place between these layers. The more layers of CuO2, the higher c. This structure causes a large anisotropy in normal conducting and superconducting properties, since electrical currents are carried by holes induced in the oxygen sites of the CuO2 sheets. The electrical conduction is highly anisotropic, with a much higher conductivity parallel to the CuO2 plane than in the perpendicular direction. Generally, critical temperatures depend on the chemical compositions, cations substitutions and oxygen content. They can be classified as superstripes; i.e., particular realizations of superlattices at atomic limit made of superconducting atomic layers, wires, dots separated by spacer layers, that gives multiband and multigap superconductivity.

Yttrium–barium cuprate

An yttrium–barium cuprate, YBa2Cu3O7−x (or Y123), was the first superconductor found above liquid nitrogen boiling point. There are two atoms of Barium for each atom of Yttrium.
The proportions of the three different metals in the YBa2Cu3O7 superconductor are in the mole ratio of 1 to 2 to 3 for yttrium to barium to copper, respectively: this particular superconductor has also often been referred to as the 123 superconductor.

The unit cell of YBa2Cu3O7 consists of three perovskite unit cells, which is pseudocubic, nearly orthorombic. The other superconducting cuprates have another structure: they have a tetragonal cell.
Each perovskite cell contains a Y or Ba atom at the center: Ba in the bottom unit cell, Y in the middle one, and Ba in the top unit cell. Thus, Y and Ba are stacked in the sequence [Ba–Y–Ba] along the c-axis. All corner sites of the unit cell are occupied by Cu, which has two different coordinations, Cu(1) and Cu(2), with respect to oxygen. There are four possible crystallographic sites for oxygen: O(1), O(2), O(3) and O(4). The coordination polyhedra of Y and Ba with respect to oxygen are different. The tripling of the perovskite unit cell leads to nine oxygen atoms, whereas YBa2Cu3O7 has seven oxygen atoms and, therefore, is referred to as an oxygen-deficient perovskite structure. The structure has a stacking of different layers: (CuO)(BaO)(CuO2)(Y)(CuO2)(BaO)(CuO). One of the key feature of the unit cell of YBa2Cu3O7−x (YBCO) is the presence of two layers of CuO2. The role of the Y plane is to serve as a spacer between two CuO2 planes. In YBCO, the Cu–O chains are known to play an important role for superconductivity. c is maximal near 92 K when x ≈ 0.15 and the structure is orthorhombic. Superconductivity disappears at x ≈ 0.6, where the structural transformation of YBCO occurs from orthorhombic to tetragonal.

Other cuprates

The preparation of other cuprates is more difficult than the YBCO preparation.
They also have a different crystal structure: they are tetragonal where YBCO is orthorhombic.
Problems in these superconductors arise because of the existence of three or more phases having a similar layered structure. 
Moreover, the crystal structure of other tested cuprate superconductors are very similar. Like YBCO, the perovskite-type feature and the presence of simple copper oxide (CuO2) layers also exist in these superconductors. However, unlike YBCO, Cu–O chains are not present in these superconductors. The YBCO superconductor has an orthorhombic structure, whereas the other high-c superconductors have a tetragonal structure.

There are three main classes of superconducting cuprates: bismuth-based, thallium-based and mercury-based.

The second cuprate by practical importance is currently BSCCO, a compound of Bi–Sr–Ca-Cu-O. The content of bismuth and strontium creates some chemical issues. 
It has three superconducting phases forming a homologous series as Bi2Sr2Can−1CunO4+2n+x (n=1, 2 and 3). 
These three phases are Bi-2201, Bi-2212 and Bi-2223, having transition temperatures of 20, 85 and 110 K, respectively, where the numbering system represent number of atoms for Bi Sr, Ca and Cu respectively. The two phases have a tetragonal structure which consists of two sheared crystallographic unit cells. The unit cell of these phases has double Bi–O planes which are stacked in a way that the Bi atom of one plane sits below the oxygen atom of the next consecutive plane. The Ca atom forms a layer within the interior of the CuO2 layers in both Bi-2212 and Bi-2223; there is no Ca layer in the Bi-2201 phase. The three phases differ with each other in the number of cuprate planes; Bi-2201, Bi-2212 and Bi-2223 phases have one, two and three CuO2 planes, respectively. The c axis lattice constants of these phases increases with the number of cuprate planes (see table below). The coordination of the Cu atom is different in the three phases. The Cu atom forms an octahedral coordination with respect to oxygen atoms in the 2201 phase, whereas in 2212, the Cu atom is surrounded by five oxygen atoms in a pyramidal arrangement. In the 2223 structure, Cu has two coordinations with respect to oxygen: one Cu atom is bonded with four oxygen atoms in square planar configuration and another Cu atom is coordinated with five oxygen atoms in a pyramidal arrangement.

Cuprate of Tl–Ba–Ca: The first series of the Tl-based superconductor containing one Tl–O layer has the general formula TlBa2Can-1CunO2n+3, whereas the second series containing two Tl–O layers has a formula of Tl2Ba2Can-1CunO2n+4 with n =1, 2 and 3. In the structure of Tl2Ba2CuO6 (Tl-2201), there is one CuO2 layer with the stacking sequence (Tl–O) (Tl–O) (Ba–O) (Cu–O) (Ba–O) (Tl–O) (Tl–O). In Tl2Ba2CaCu2O8 (Tl-2212), there are two Cu–O layers with a Ca layer in between. Similar to the Tl2Ba2CuO6 structure, Tl–O layers are present outside the Ba–O layers. In Tl2Ba2Ca2Cu3O10 (Tl-2223), there are three CuO2 layers enclosing Ca layers between each of these. In Tl-based superconductors, c is found to increase with the increase in CuO2 layers. However, the value of c decreases after four CuO2 layers in TlBa2Can-1CunO2n+3, and in the Tl2Ba2Can-1CunO2n+4 compound, it decreases after three CuO2 layers.

Cuprate of Hg–Ba–Ca The crystal structure of HgBa2CuO4 (Hg-1201), HgBa2CaCu2O6 (Hg-1212) and HgBa2Ca2Cu3O8 (Hg-1223) is similar to that of Tl-1201, Tl-1212 and Tl-1223, with Hg in place of Tl. It is noteworthy that the c of the Hg compound (Hg-1201) containing one CuO2 layer is much larger as compared to the one-CuO2-layer compound of thallium (Tl-1201). In the Hg-based superconductor, c is also found to increase as the CuO2 layer increases. For Hg-1201, Hg-1212 and Hg-1223, the values of c are 94, 128, and the record value at ambient pressure 134 K, respectively, as shown in table below. The observation that the c of Hg-1223 increases to 153 K under high pressure indicates that the c of this compound is very sensitive to the structure of the compound.

Preparation and manufacturing
The simplest method for preparing ceramic superconductors is a solid-state thermochemical reaction involving mixing, calcination and sintering. 
The appropriate amounts of precursor powders, usually oxides and carbonates, are mixed thoroughly using a Ball mill. Solution chemistry processes such as coprecipitation, freeze-drying and sol–gel methods are alternative ways for preparing a homogeneous mixture. These powders are calcined in the temperature range from 800–950 °C for several hours. The powders are cooled, reground and calcined again. This process is repeated several times to get homogeneous material. The powders are subsequently compacted to pellets and sintered. The sintering environment such as temperature, annealing time, atmosphere and cooling rate play a very important role in getting good high-c superconducting materials. The YBa2Cu3O7−x compound is prepared by calcination and sintering of a homogeneous mixture of Y2O3, BaCO3 and CuO in the appropriate atomic ratio. Calcination is done at 900–950 °C, whereas sintering is done at 950 °C in an oxygen atmosphere. The oxygen stoichiometry in this material is very crucial for obtaining a superconducting YBa2Cu3O7−x compound. At the time of sintering, the semiconducting tetragonal YBa2Cu3O6 compound is formed, which, on slow cooling in oxygen atmosphere, turns into superconducting YBa2Cu3O7−x. The uptake and loss of oxygen are reversible in YBa2Cu3O7−x. A fully oxygenated orthorhombic YBa2Cu3O7−x sample can be transformed into tetragonal YBa2Cu3O6 by heating in a vacuum at temperature above 700 °C.

The preparation of Bi-, Tl- and Hg-based high-c superconductors is more difficult than the YBCO preparation. Problems in these superconductors arise because of the existence of three or more phases having a similar layered structure. Thus, syntactic intergrowth and defects such as stacking faults occur during synthesis and it becomes difficult to isolate a single superconducting phase. For Bi–Sr–Ca–Cu–O, it is relatively simple to prepare the Bi-2212 (c ≈ 85 K) phase, whereas it is very difficult to prepare a single phase of Bi-2223 (c ≈ 110 K). The Bi-2212 phase appears only after few hours of sintering at 860–870 °C, but the larger fraction of the Bi-2223 phase is formed after a long reaction time of more than a week at 870 °C. Although the substitution of Pb in the Bi–Sr–Ca–Cu–O compound has been found to promote the growth of the high-c phase, a long sintering time is still required.

Ongoing research
The question of how superconductivity arises in high-temperature superconductors is one of the major unsolved problems of theoretical condensed matter physics. The mechanism that causes the electrons in these crystals to form pairs is not known. Despite intensive research and many promising leads, an explanation has so far eluded scientists. One reason for this is that the materials in question are generally very complex, multi-layered crystals (for example, BSCCO), making theoretical modelling difficult.

Improving the quality and variety of samples also gives rise to considerable research, both with the aim of improved characterisation of the physical properties of existing compounds, and synthesizing new materials, often with the hope of increasing c. Technological research focuses on making HTS materials in sufficient quantities to make their use economically viable  as well as in optimizing their properties in relation to applications.
Metallic Hydrogen has been proposed as a room-temperature superconductor, some experimental observations have detected the occurrence of the Meissner effect

Theoretical models
There have been two representative theories for high-temperature or unconventional superconductivity. 
Firstly, weak coupling theory suggests superconductivity emerges from antiferromagnetic spin fluctuations in a doped system. According to this theory, the pairing wave function of the cuprate HTS should have a dx2-y2 symmetry. Thus, determining whether the pairing wave function has d-wave symmetry is essential to test the spin fluctuation mechanism. That is, if the HTS order parameter (a pairing wave function like in Ginzburg–Landau theory) does not have d-wave symmetry, then a pairing mechanism related to spin fluctuations can be ruled out. (Similar arguments can be made for iron-based superconductors but the different material properties allow a different pairing symmetry.) Secondly, there was the interlayer coupling model, according to which a layered structure consisting of BCS-type (s-wave symmetry) superconductors can enhance the superconductivity by itself. By introducing an additional tunnelling interaction between each layer, this model successfully explained the anisotropic symmetry of the order parameter as well as the emergence of the HTS. Thus, in order to solve this unsettled problem, there have been numerous experiments such as photoemission spectroscopy, NMR, specific heat measurements, etc. Up to date the results were ambiguous, some reports supported the d symmetry for the HTS whereas others supported the s symmetry. This muddy situation possibly originated from the indirect nature of the experimental evidence, as well as experimental issues such as sample quality, impurity scattering, twinning, etc.

This summary makes an implicit assumption: superconductive properties can be treated by mean-field theory. It also fails to mention that in addition to the superconductive gap, there is a second gap, the pseudogap. The cuprate layers are insulating, and the superconductors are doped with interlayer impurities to make them metallic. The superconductive transition temperature can be maximized by varying the dopant concentration. The simplest example is La2CuO4, which consist of alternating CuO2 and LaO layers which are insulating when pure. When 8% of the La is replaced by Sr, the latter act as dopants, contributing holes to the CuO2 layers, and making the sample metallic. The Sr impurities also act as electronic bridges, enabling interlayer coupling. Proceeding from this picture, some theories argue that the basic pairing interaction is still interaction with phonons, as in the conventional superconductors with Cooper pairs. While the undoped materials are antiferromagnetic, even a few percent of impurity dopants introduce a smaller pseudogap in the CuO2 planes which is also caused by phonons. The gap decreases with increasing charge carriers, and as it nears the superconductive gap, the latter reaches its maximum. The reason for the high transition temperature is then argued to be due to the percolating behaviour of the carriersthe carriers follow zig-zag percolative paths, largely in metallic domains in the CuO2 planes, until blocked by charge density wave domain walls, where they use dopant bridges to cross over to a metallic domain of an adjacent CuO2 plane. The transition temperature maxima are reached when the host lattice has weak bond-bending forces, which produce strong electron-phonon interactions at the interlayer dopants.

D symmetry in YBCO

An experiment based on flux quantization of a three-grain ring of YBa2Cu3O7 (YBCO) was proposed to test the symmetry of the order parameter in the HTS. The symmetry of the order parameter could best be probed at the junction interface as the Cooper pairs tunnel across a Josephson junction or weak link. 
It was expected that a half-integer flux, that is, a spontaneous magnetization could only occur for a junction of d symmetry superconductors. But, even if the junction experiment is the strongest method to determine the symmetry of the HTS order parameter, the results have been ambiguous. John R. Kirtley and C. C. Tsuei thought that the ambiguous results came from the defects inside the HTS, so that they designed an experiment where both clean limit (no defects) and dirty limit (maximal defects) were considered simultaneously. In the experiment, the spontaneous magnetization was clearly observed in YBCO, which supported the d symmetry of the order parameter in YBCO. But, since YBCO is orthorhombic, it might inherently have an admixture of s symmetry. So, by tuning their technique further, they found that there was an admixture of s symmetry in YBCO within about 3%. Also, they found that there was a pure dx2-y2 order parameter symmetry in the tetragonal Tl2Ba2CuO6.

Spin-fluctuation mechanism

Despite all these years, the mechanism of high-c superconductivity is still highly controversial, mostly due to the lack of exact theoretical computations on such strongly interacting electron systems. However, most rigorous theoretical calculations, including phenomenological and diagrammatic approaches, converge on magnetic fluctuations as the pairing mechanism for these systems. The qualitative explanation is as follows:

In a superconductor, the flow of electrons cannot be resolved into individual electrons, but instead consists of many pairs of bound electrons, called Cooper pairs. In conventional superconductors, these pairs are formed when an electron moving through the material distorts the surrounding crystal lattice, which in turn attracts another electron and forms a bound pair. This is sometimes called the "water bed" effect. Each Cooper pair requires a certain minimum energy to be displaced, and if the thermal fluctuations in the crystal lattice are smaller than this energy the pair can flow without dissipating energy. This ability of the electrons to flow without resistance leads to superconductivity.

In a high-c superconductor, the mechanism is extremely similar to a conventional superconductor, except, in this case, phonons virtually play no role and their role is replaced by spin-density waves. Just as all known conventional superconductors are strong phonon systems, all known high-c superconductors are strong spin-density wave systems, within close vicinity of a magnetic transition to, for example, an antiferromagnet. When an electron moves in a high-c superconductor, its spin creates a spin-density wave around it. This spin-density wave in turn causes a nearby electron to fall into the spin depression created by the first electron (water-bed effect again). Hence, again, a Cooper pair is formed. When the system temperature is lowered, more spin density waves and Cooper pairs are created, eventually leading to superconductivity. Note that in high-c systems, as these systems are magnetic systems due to the Coulomb interaction, there is a strong Coulomb repulsion between electrons. This Coulomb repulsion prevents pairing of the Cooper pairs on the same lattice site. The pairing of the electrons occur at near-neighbor lattice sites as a result. This is the so-called d-wave pairing, where the pairing state has a node (zero) at the origin.

Examples

Examples of high-c cuprate superconductors include YBCO and BSCCO, which are the most known materials that achieve superconductivity above the boiling point of liquid nitrogen.

See also

References

External links
 
 
 
 
 
 
 
 
 

High-temperature superconductors
Correlated electrons
Emerging technologies
Unsolved problems in physics